The Convention concerning the Right of Association and the Settlement of Labour Disputes in Non-Metropolitan Territories is  an International Labour Organization Convention on the rights of workers in non-metropoliton territories (e.g. dependent territories, or DOMTOMs) to form and be active in labour unions.

Ratifications 
As of 2022, the convention has been ratified by nine states.

See also
Right of Association (Agriculture) Convention

External links 
Text.
Ratifications.

Freedom of association
International Labour Organization conventions
Treaties concluded in 1947
Treaties entered into force in 1953
Treaties of Belgium
Treaties of Fiji
Treaties of the French Fourth Republic
Treaties of Mauritania
Treaties of Mauritius
Treaties of New Zealand
Treaties of the Solomon Islands
Treaties of the Somali Democratic Republic
Treaties of the United Kingdom
1947 in labor relations